Charles Russell Spencer Allwright (11 June 1888 – May 1966) was an English professional football outside right who played in the Football League for Bristol City.

Career statistics

References

1888 births
English footballers
Footballers from Brentford
Brentford F.C. players
English Football League players
Association football outside forwards
Bristol City F.C. players
Swindon Town F.C. players
Southern Football League players
1966 deaths